Coyoteville may refer to:
 Coyoteville, California, in El Dorado County
 Coyoteville, Nevada County, California